KBAB may refer to:

 KBAB-LD, a television rebroadcaster (channel 31, virtual 50) licensed to serve Santa Barbara, California, United States
 Beale Air Force Base (ICAO code KBAB)